Mumfordgunj or Mumfordganj, built in late 1930s, is a neighborhood in Allahabad, India. There are MIG and HIG colonies in this locality. It also has a municipality school.

References

Neighbourhoods in Allahabad